Invicta Fighting Championships, also known as Invicta FC, is an American professional mixed martial arts (MMA) promotion dedicated to Women's mixed martial arts  that was founded in 2012 by Janet Martin and Shannon Knapp. The promotion is currently owned by the Canadian-based Anthem Sports & Entertainment.

The company's name comes from the Latin word for "invincible and incomparable", which appears in the feminine form.

History
Knapp would meet with Janet Martin and the two acquired the financial resources needed to launch a new MMA promotion.

The event was headlined by a rematch between former Strikeforce women's bantamweight champion Marloes Coenen and French fighter Romy Ruyssen. The event also marked the MMA debut of 2008 Summer Olympics women's freestyle wrestling medalist Randi Miller.

On June 9, 2012, it was announced that Invicta has formed a strategic partnership with Japanese promotion JEWELS to cross-promote fighters on their respective cards in the United States and Japan. On September 24, Invicta would announce another cross-promotional partnership with the Super Fight League.

Invicta FC 6: Coenen vs. Cyborg, which took place on July 13, 2013, would mark the first event to be aired on cable and satellite pay-per-view, in addition to IPPV through a deal with Integrated Sports Media for live viewing. In 2014, Invicta began exclusively streaming events on UFC Fight Pass, with the company's fight library also made available on the service. Invicta FC 8 would be the first event to stream live on Fight Pass.

On February 24, 2015, Brazilian channel Combate acquired broadcast rights to Invicta live events as well as events from the Invicta library in South America.

On April 15, 2021, it was announced that Anthem Sports & Entertainment had acquired Invicta. Starting with Invicta FC 44 on May 21, 2021, Invicta events are broadcast live on the Anthem-owned networks AXS TV and Fight Network in the United States and Canada, respectively. Invicta's events would also stream live on the promotion's YouTube channel. On September 21, 2022, Invicta announced that it had made a deal with FOX Sports Mexico for Mexican broadcast rights, starting with Invicta FC 49.

Roster

Rules

Invicta's current rules follows the Unified Rules of Mixed Martial Arts that were originally established by the New Jersey State Athletic Control Board and modified by the Nevada State Athletic Commission.

Events

Scheduled events

Past events

Current champions

Title history

Featherweight Championship
136 to 145 lbs (62 to 66 kg)

Bantamweight Championship
126 to 135 lbs (57 to 61 kg)

Flyweight Championship
116 to 125 lbs (53 to 56 kg)

Strawweight Championship
106 to 115 lbs (49 to 52 kg)

Atomweight Championship
96 to 105 lbs (44 to 48 kg)

Records

Most wins in title bouts

Most consecutive title defenses

Champions by nationality
The division champions include only linear and true champions. Interim champions who have never become linear champions will be listed as interim champions. Fighters with multiple title reigns in a specific division will also be counted once.

See also
 List of current Invicta FC fighters
 List of current mixed martial arts champions
 List of Bellator MMA champions
 List of EliteXC champions
 List of ONE Championship champions
 List of Pride champions
 List of PFL champions
 List of Strikeforce champions
 List of UFC champions
 List of WEC champions
 Mixed martial arts weight classes

References

External links

 
2012 establishments in North Carolina
Sports organizations established in 2012
Mixed martial arts organizations
Women's mixed martial arts
2021 mergers and acquisitions